Brown Publishing Company was a privately owned Cincinnati, Ohio, newspaper business started by Congressman Clarence J. Brown in Blanchester, Ohio in 1920. It ended 90 years of operations in August/September 2010 with its bankruptcy and sale of assets to a new company formed by its creditors and called Ohio Community Media Inc. The company was previously a family-owned business; it  published 18 daily newspapers, 27 weekly newspapers, and 26 free weeklies.  The former CEO was Brown's grandson, Roy Brown.  The chairman of the board was Roy's brother Clancy Brown, who is also an actor.

Bankruptcy proceedings
On April 30, 2010, the company and its subsidiaries filed for bankruptcy in federal court in Central Islip, New York, in the Eastern District of New York in Docket 10-73295. It listed Brown and 14 affiliates, with assets of $94.1 million and $104.6 million in debts as of March 31, 2010.  Its affiliates included Delaware Gazette Co., Texas Business News LLC, Utah Business Publishers LLC, Texas Community Newspapers Inc., Upstate Business News LLC, Troy Daily News Inc., SC Biz News LLC, ARG LLC, Brown Business Ledger LLC, Dan's Papers Inc., Business Publications LLC.

Several key executives of Brown Publishing submitted a plan to purchase key assets of the company under the auspices of a newly created company, Brown Media Holdings. This plan fell through when a key lender backing the plan withdrew its offer.

On September 3, 2010, it was announced that Manhattan Media had purchased Dan's Papers, Montauk Pioneer, and Hampton Style Magazine from Brown.

Later in September, Brown's 14 Ohio dailies and about 50 weekly publications were transferred to Ohio Community Media, a new entity owned by Brown's creditors, in a transaction valued at $21.75 million. Over the next few months, the new company sold a "mini-empire" of business newsweeklies which Brown had assembled starting in 2007. The company sold titles in cities including Charleston, South Carolina; Cheyenne, Wyoming; Fort Worth, Texas; and Naperville, Illinois. 

Philadelphia-based Versa Capital Management completed its purchase of Ohio Community Media for an undisclosed price in May 2011. By this point, the chain consisted of 14 daily newspapers and about 30 weeklies, all located in Ohio.

Publications

Dailies
Beavercreek - News Current
Delaware - Delaware Gazette
Fairborn - Daily Herald
Galion - Inquirer
Greenville - Advocate
Hillsboro - Times-Gazette
London - Madison Press
Piqua - Daily Call
Sidney - Daily News
Troy - Daily News
Urbana - Daily Citizen
Washington Court House - Record-Herald
Wilmington - News Journal
Xenia - Daily Gazette

Paid weeklies
Bellville - The Bellville Star
Cardington - Morrow County Independent
Columbus Grove - Putnam County Vidette
Dayton - Times Community Newspapers
Eaton - The Register-Herald
Englewood Independent
Athens The Athens Messenger
Huber Heights Courier
New Carlisle Sun Times Weekend Edition
Tipp City Herald
Vandalia Drummer News
West Milton Record
Fredericktown - Knox County Citizen
Georgetown - The News Democrat
Jackson - Times Journal
McArthur - Vinton County Courier
Mechanicsburg - The Telegram
Mount Gilead - The Morrow County Sentinel
Mount Sterling - The Tribune
New Lexington - Perry County Tribune
Ottawa - Putnam County Sentinel
Plain City - Plain City Advocate
Ripley - The Ripley Bee
Sunbury - The Sunbury News
Waverly - Pike County News Watchman
West Union - People's Defender

Free weeklies

Ohio
Circleville - Pickaway County Paper
Dayton - The Scoop
Dayton - Times Community Newspapers
Beavercreek News-Current Extra
Centerville-Bellbrook Times
Kettering-Oakwood Times
Springboro Sun
Wright-Patterson AFB - Skywrighter
Eaton - Weekend Edition
Galion - Advertiser
Gallipolis - River Cities & More
Georgetown - The News Democrat (Sunday)
Greenville - Sunday Edition
Hillsboro - The County Shopper
Jackson - Community Shopper
London - Madison Press Weekly Review
Mount Gilead - Morrow County Advertiser
New Lexington - Perry County Shopper
Ottawa - Putnam County Advertiser
Piqua - Miami County Advocate
Portsmouth - The Community Common
Urbana - Sunday Extra
Van Wert - Sign of the Times
Washington C.H. - South Central Ohio Shopper
Waverly/Chillicothe - Pike/Ross County Paper
West Union - People's Defender (Weekend Edition)
Wilmington - Star Republican
Xenia - Greene County Shopper

Former holdings, New York
 Bridgehampton, New York - Dan's Papers
 Bridgehampton, New York - Hampton Style
 Montauk, New York - Montauk Pioneer

References

External links
Brown Publishing Company website
Ohio Community Media - successor company

Newspaper companies of the United States
1920 establishments in Ohio
Publishing companies established in 1920